The Château de Tournon is a listed castle in Tournon-sur-Rhône, Ardèche, France. It was built in the 16th century. It has been listed as an official historical monument since July 1926.

References

Houses completed in the 16th century
Châteaux in Ardèche
Monuments historiques of Auvergne-Rhône-Alpes